Iliana Biridakis (born September 29, 1959) is a retired Jordanian Olympic archer. She represented Jordan at 1988 Summer Olympics in Seoul.

Olympic participation

Seoul 1988

Archery – Women's Individual

She ranked 61st out of 62 competitor in the final standing.

References

External links
Iliana Peridakis at worldarchery.org

1959 births
Living people
Archers at the 1988 Summer Olympics
Jordanian female archers
Olympic archers of Jordan